Winnsboro Independent School District is an independent school district based in Winnsboro, Texas, United States.  Located in northeastern Wood County, the district extends into southeast Hopkins and southern Franklin counties.  In 2013, the school district was rated Met Standard by the Texas Education Agency.

References

External links

School districts in Wood County, Texas
School districts in Hopkins County, Texas
School districts in Franklin County, Texas